Geoffrey Bouchard (born 1 April 1992) is a French cyclist, who currently rides for UCI WorldTeam . 

In August 2019, he was named in the startlist for the 2019 Vuelta a España. He took over the lead in the King of the Mountains competition following stage 16 and would hold this lead for the remainder of the race. In October 2020, he was named in the startlist for the 2020 Giro d'Italia.  He would also start the Giro the following year, and in May 2021 he became the first French rider to win the mountains classification in the Giro since Laurent Fignon in 1984.

Major results

2018
 1st  Road race, National Amateur Road Championships
 1st  Overall Tour Alsace
1st Stage 2
 3rd Tour du Gévaudan Occitanie
2019
 Vuelta a España
1st  Mountains classification
 Combativity award Stage 9
2021
 1st  Mountains classification, Giro d'Italia
 3rd Paris–Camembert
 9th Overall Vuelta a Burgos
 10th Mont Ventoux Dénivelé Challenge
2022
 1st Stage 1 Tour of the Alps
 4th Paris–Camembert
 8th Overall UAE Tour
2023
 3rd Overall Tour of Oman

Grand Tour general classification results timeline

References

External links

1992 births
Living people
French male cyclists
Sportspeople from Dijon
Cyclists from Bourgogne-Franche-Comté
20th-century French people
21st-century French people